Kathalo Rajakumari (English: Princess in the story) is a 2017 Telugu romantic drama film directed by debutant Mahesh Surapaneni and produced by Soundarya Narra, Prashanthi, Bheeram Sudhakar Reddy, and Krishna Vijay. Nara Rohit and Namitha Pramod play the lead roles in the movie. Naga Shourya makes a cameo appearance in this film.

Plot
The movie deals with two film stars: Arjun (Nara Rohit), an arrogant film star famous for playing the antagonist; and Shourya (Naga Shourya), the underdog who does not get enough credit for his hard work. Arjun, who is famous for his villainous streak and attitude, feels he has lost his mean game and decides to become a villain in real life so that he can gain his mean streak back. He chooses his childhood friend Sita (Namitha Pramod) for this purpose and decides to make her his victim. What does he do and what happens next forms the rest of the plot.

Cast
Nara Rohit as Arjun Chakravarthy
Namitha Pramod as Sita
Nanditha Raj as Nanditha
Prabhas Sreenu as Bheem Sagar alias Secret Star Rathi Sagar
Surya as Driver Shiva
Ajay as Arjun's friend
Rajiv Kanakala as Arjun's father
Tanikella Bharani as Principal
Kota Srinivasa Rao as himself
Srinivas Avasarala as himself
Chalapathi Rao as himself
Satya
Naga Shourya as Shourya (Cameo appearance)

Soundtrack

The music was composed by Vishal Chandrasekhar, Ilaiyaraaja and Released by Aran Music.

References 

2017 films
2010s Telugu-language films
Films scored by Ilaiyaraaja
2017 romantic drama films
Indian romantic drama films